Schlangenbad is a municipality in the Rheingau-Taunus-Kreis in the Regierungsbezirk of Darmstadt in Hesse, Germany.

Geography

Location 

Neighbouring communities 
Schlangenbad borders in the north on the town of Bad Schwalbach, in the east on the town of Taunusstein and the district-free city of Wiesbaden, in the south on the town of Eltville and the community of Kiedrich and in the west on the town of Oestrich-Winkel.

Constituent communities 
Schlangenbad's Ortsteile are the state-recognized health resort of Schlangenbad and its outlying centres of Georgenborn, Wambach, Bärstadt, Hausen vor der Höhe, Obergladbach and Niedergladbach.

Climate 
It does, however, cool off quite sharply in the nighttime. This moderate climate is comparable to a Mediterranean climate.

The temperate climate permits a remnant population of Aesculapian Snakes to survive in the area, despite the general cooling of the climate in what is now Germany. These snakes were once widespread in Middle Europe in warmer times, but are now otherwise only found in Mediterranean lands.  Indeed, snakes are Schlangenbad's namesake: the community's name literally means “Snake Bath” in German.

Spa operations 

Schlangenbad's thermal springs were discovered in the mid 17th century. Today, nine springs are running altogether. Rheumatic and other inflammatory illnesses are treated at the spa.

Sport and leisure facilities 
 Thermal outdoor swimming pool with kelosauna
 Aeskulap-Therme (baths)
 Schlangenbad tennis courts
 Heinz Grein-Sporthalle Georgenborn
 Sporthalle Bärstadt
 Hausen football pitch

Hiking trails 
 The Rheinsteig, a new trail from Schloss Biebrich near Wiesbaden to Bonn by way of the Loreley, the “Enemy Brothers” castles (Liebenstein and Sterrenberg) and Lahneck Castle.
 Hiking trail to Rauenthal about 45 minutes away, with an outstanding view over the Rhine Gorge.
 Loop trails at the "Förster-Bitter-Eiche" carpark near the "Hinterlandswald".

Politics

Community council 

The municipal election held on 26 March 2006 yielded the following results:

Town partnerships 
 Craponne, Rhône, France

Education 
 Bärstadt primary school

Famous people

Sons and daughters of the town 
 Ludwig von Lauter (1855–1929), Prussian artillery general
 Max Knoll (1897–1969), German electrical engineer, codeveloper of the first electron microscope

Former and current Schlangenbad residents 
Ludwig Berger (1892–1969), filmmaker and writer
Volker Schlöndorff (1939–    ), filmmaker and Oscar winner
Wolf von Lojewski (1937–    ), television moderator
Zascha Kourosh Pezeshkan (1969–Present), KRAFT Construction in Florida

Fiction 
 Grant Allen's fictional late 19th century lady detective Miss Lois Cayley visits Schlangenbad in the 1899 novel Miss Cayley's Adventures.

References

External links 

  
 Hessisan spas - Schlangenbad 

Rheingau-Taunus-Kreis
Spa towns in Germany